Nandyal Assembly constituency is a constituency of the Andhra Pradesh Legislative Assembly, India. It is one of 7 
constituencies in the Nandyal district.

Silpa Ravi Chandra Kishore Reddy of YSR Congress Party is currently representing the constituency.

Overview
It is part of the Nandyal Lok Sabha constituency along with another six Vidhan Sabha segments, namely, Allagadda, Srisailam, Nandikotkur, Panyam, Banaganapalle and Dhone in Nandyal district.

Mandals

Members of Legislative Assembly

Election results

Assembly elections 1952

1959 By-election

Assembly Elections 2004

Assembly Elections 2009

Assembly elections 2014

By election 2017

Assembly Election 2019

See also
 List of constituencies of Andhra Pradesh Legislative Assembly

References

Assembly constituencies of Andhra Pradesh